The 2011 Ole Miss Rebels football team represented the University of Mississippi in the 2011 NCAA Division I FBS football season. The team was coached by Houston Nutt, who was in his fourth season. The Rebels played their home games at Vaught–Hemingway Stadium in Oxford, Mississippi, and competed in the Western Division of the Southeastern Conference (SEC). They finished the season 2–10, 0–8 in SEC play to finish in last place in the Western Division.  On November 7, Nutt resigned as head coach effective at the end of the season.

On February 11, 2019, Ole Miss announced the vacation of all wins in the years 2010, 2011, 2012, and 2016. In 2013, all wins except the Music City Bowl were vacated. In 2014, all wins except the Presbyterian game were vacated.

Personnel

Coaching staff

Recruiting class

Ole Miss signed the No. 18 recruiting class according to Rivals and the No. 24 recruiting class according to Scout.

Schedule

Game summaries

Fresno State

References

Ole Miss
Ole Miss Rebels football seasons
Ole Miss Rebels football